This One's For You is the fourth studio album by singer-songwriter Barry Manilow released in 1976. The album went 2× platinum and yielded the hits "This One's for You", "Weekend in New England", "Looks Like We Made It", and the original version of "Daybreak". The album debuted on the Billboard Top LPs chart on August 21, 1976, peaking at number six in 1977.

Track listing
All music by Barry Manilow; all lyrics by Adrienne Anderson; except where indicated

Side one
"This One's for You" (lyrics: Marty Panzer) - 3:25
"Daybreak" - 3:10
"You Oughta Be Home with Me" - 3:13
"Jump Shout Boogie" (lyrics: Bruce Sussman) - 3:03
"Weekend in New England" (Randy Edelman) - 3:43

Side two
"Riders to the Stars" - 3:47
"Let Me Go" (lyrics: Marty Panzer) - 3:58
"Looks Like We Made It" (music: Richard Kerr; lyrics: Will Jennings) - 3:33
"Say the Words" (lyrics: Barry Manilow) - 2:53
"All the Time" (lyrics: Marty Panzer) - 3:15
"(Why Don't You) See the Show Again" - 4:32

CD bonus tracks (2006)
"Don't Throw It All Away"
"Can't Go Back Anymore"
"This Is Fine"
"I Really Do Write the Songs"

Personnel
Barry Manilow - vocals, piano, arrangements
Dennis Farac, Richard Resnicoff, David Spinozza, Jerry Friedman - guitar
Steven Donaghey, Will Lee - bass guitar
Alan Axelrod, Paul Shaffer - keyboards
Lee Gurst, Ronnie Zito - drums
Carlos Martin - percussion
Debra Byrd, Lady Flash, Monica Burruss, Ron Dante - backing vocals
Gerald Atlers, Charlie Calello, Van McCoy, Dick Behrke - orchestration
Technical
Michael DeLugg - recording engineer
Lee Gurst - cover design, photography

Certifications

References

Barry Manilow albums
1976 albums
Arista Records albums
Albums produced by Ron Dante